Neocalyptis nuristana is a species of moth of the family Tortricidae. It is found in Afghanistan.

References

	

Moths described in 1967
Neocalyptis